Muskegon State Park is a public recreation area located  west of North Muskegon in Muskegon County, Michigan. The park's  encompass two miles of sand beach on Lake Michigan and one mile of beach on Muskegon Lake.

History
The park was established in 1923 when the state purchased some 840 acres at the former site of the Ryerson Hill & Company lumber mill in Snug Harbor. The Civilian Conservation Corps was active in the park in 1933 and 1934, building roads, planting trees and clearing campsites. Most notably, the corps built a square blockhouse with scenic views from the highest point in Muskegon County. A replica stands at the site of the CCC's original blockhouse which burned down in the 1960s. The Works Progress Administration made further improvements from 1937 to 1941, developing the beach area and extending the scenic drive along Lake Michigan.

Activities and amenities
The park offers swimming, picnicking, two fishing piers, twelve miles of hiking trails, boat launch, and two campgrounds. Winter offerings in the park include five miles of cross-country skiing trails, ice skating, and ice fishing. The park features a luge track, where U.S. Olympic team member Mark Grimmette started training.

References

External links

Muskegon State Park Michigan Department of Natural Resources
Muskegon State Park Map Michigan Department of Natural Resources

State parks of Michigan
Protected areas of Muskegon County, Michigan
Protected areas established in 1923
1923 establishments in Michigan
IUCN Category III
Beaches of Michigan
Landforms of Muskegon County, Michigan
Civilian Conservation Corps in Michigan
Works Progress Administration in Michigan